The Women's London Championship (WLC) is an English women's cricket competition. It was created in 2020 following the introduction of the regional Rachael Heyhoe Flint Trophy as the highest domestic competition in women's One Day cricket. The competition features the women's county cricket teams from the Home Counties.

History 
Originally the Women's County Championship was the highest 50 over competition in English women's cricket. However, the tournament ended in 2019 to make way for a regionalised 50-over tournament and The Hundred. This decision was not popular with some of the county teams who felt that the new competition had removed their representation in the top flight of women's cricket. The Women's London Championship was created as a county replacement. The first season in 2020 featured the Home Counties of Kent, Middlesex, Surrey and Essex. Though it was endorsed by the England and Wales Cricket Board (ECB), it was viewed as a breakaway tournament due to a negative perception of the ECB's way of administering women's cricket by reducing the number of teams from counties to regions. The counties also engaged in a running competition as a warmup. The matches would be played at county outgrounds such as Kent playing at the Nevill Ground, Royal Tunbridge Wells and Middlesex playing at Mill Hill School, London. The inaugural competition was won by Surrey.

For the 2021 season, it was announced that Sussex would be joining the competition. The South East Stars and Sunrisers regional teams agreed to release their contracted players to represent their counties in the Women's London Championship. Kent won the 2021 tournament, winning three of their four matches, with defending champions Surrey in second place. Surrey regained their title in 2022, winning three of their four matches (with the other match cancelled).

Teams

References

Women's cricket competitions in England
English domestic cricket competitions
Cricket in Kent
Cricket in Middlesex
Cricket in Surrey
Cricket in Essex
Cricket in Sussex
2020 establishments in England